Terry Jordan is a fiction writer, musician, essaying and dramatist whose stage plays have been produced across the country, in the U.S and Ireland. His book of stories It's a Hard Cow, won a Saskatchewan Book Award and was nominated for the Commonwealth Book Prize. His novel, Beneath That Starry Place was published internationally. The Globe and Mail called it "an achingly beautiful book."

Jordan taught Creative Writing at Concordia University, Montreal, and was the first Margaret Laurence Fellow at Trent University. In the past he facilitated the Fiction workshop at Sage Hill Writing Experience, served as Writer in Residence at the Saskatoon, Regina and Winnipeg Public Libraries, and Okanagan College.

Publications
Been in the Storm So Long (novel). Coteau Books, Regina
We're Already Home (play). Wild Sage Press, Regina.
False Spring. Letterpress edition. New Leaf Editions, Vancouver.
Une Constellation d'escrocs. JC Lattes, Paris, France.
Beneath That Starry Place (novel). HarperCollins Publishers (Canada), Toronto. U.S. Edition: MacMurray and Beck Publishers, Denver/San Francisco USA.
It's A Hard Cow (short story collection). Thistledown, Saskatoon.
Numbers. Pachyderm, Winnipeg.
Movie Dust. Small Poetry, San Francisco USA.

References

Canadian male novelists
Canadian male short story writers
20th-century Canadian dramatists and playwrights
21st-century Canadian dramatists and playwrights
20th-century Canadian novelists
21st-century Canadian novelists
Living people
Trent University alumni
Writers from Saskatoon
Canadian male dramatists and playwrights
20th-century Canadian short story writers
21st-century Canadian short story writers
Year of birth missing (living people)
20th-century Canadian male writers
21st-century Canadian male writers